Jacques Mathou is a French actor, best known for his appearance in Delicatessen.

Filmography
 1985 : Tranches de vie
 1986 : Betty Blue, Bob
 1987 : L'été en pente douce
 1987 : Si le soleil ne revenait pas
 1989 : Roselyne et les lions, Armani
 1989 : Dédé, the priest
 1990 : The Hairdresser's Husband, Mr Chardon
 1991 : Delicatessen, Roger
 1994 : Tombés du ciel, Policeman
 1996 : Les Grands Ducs, Janvier
 2011 : Voir la mer, Jacky Novion
 2005 : La vie est à nous !, M. Antoine
 2006 : My Best Friend, Bruno's father

External links
 Jacques Mathou on IMDB.com

Living people
Year of birth missing (living people)
French male film actors
French male television actors
French male stage actors